Osama Chtiba (born 27 September 1988) is a Libyan footballer who plays as a centre-back for Libyan club Al Ahli Tripoli.

Club career
In January 2019, Chtiba joined Al Ahli Tripoli.

References

External links
 
 

1988 births
Living people
People from Tripoli, Libya
Libyan footballers
Association football central defenders
Al-Nasr SC (Benghazi) players
Al-Ittihad Club (Tripoli) players
Nejmeh SC players
Annajma SC players
Al-Ahli SC (Tripoli) players
Libyan Premier League players
Lebanese Premier League players
Libya A' international footballers
Libya international footballers
2012 Africa Cup of Nations players
2014 African Nations Championship players
Libyan expatriate footballers
Libyan expatriate sportspeople in Lebanon
Expatriate footballers in Lebanon